= Egomeli K. Hormeku =

- Born: January 19, 1987 (age 39); Brooklyn, New York, U.S.
- Education: University of Arizona
- Occupations: Entrepreneur, editor-in-chief, author
- Organization: Alpha Phi Alpha

Egomeli K. Hormeku (born January 19, 1987) is a serial entrepreneur, author and designer of a clothing line called Nothing Nice New York. He founded and runs The Hormeku Group.

== Early life ==
Hormeku was raised in Brownsville, Brooklyn, then a relatively high-crime "tough" area. He is the son of Gloria Obuobi, an OB/GYN registered nurse, and Kofi Hormeku, a retired case worker for NYC Human Resources.

== Education ==
Hormeku attended the University of Arizona, where he earned a Bachelor of Arts degree with a double major in political science and physiological sciences in three years. While at the University of Arizona, Hormeku was inducted into the Alpha Phi Alpha fraternity, and began the project that would culminate in his book, The Nerdy McFly Manifesto. Hormeku also graduated from the Cornell Business Strategy Exec Program.

== The Hormeku Group ==
The Hormeku Group conglomerate is the umbrella company for Hormeku's businesses. Hormeku runs The Hormeku Group from his office in Brownsville, Brooklyn, where he operates his nine brands: Nerdy McFly Publications; Nothing Nice New York; HORMEKU (private women's collection); Vida Chocolate; Steel Wine and Spirits; The RNWY App; THG Films; The C New York; THGPRSNTS (event planning); and Late Night Great Night. Hormeku plans to open a flagship store to display all his brands, but until then, all his brands and products are available online.

=== Nerdy McFly, LLC. ===
The first business Hormeku formed was his publication, Nerdy McFly, LLC. As an undergraduate student, Hormeku and his closest friends wrote The Nerdy McFly Manifesto, a book that contained 101 rules for young men on how to balance staying smart and staying cool. Hormeku used the manifesto and the collection of the good times he spent in college to publish Hope This Helps, "a book tackling demeanor, comportment, contemporary chivalry, chances, choices and education." When asked to describe the vision of Hope This Helps, Hormeku said, "James Dean meets Steve Urkel." The final installment of the series is a mini book and ebook of four hundred rules penned by Hormeku, allowing the brand to expand to the public speaking, book tour, and workshop realm.

=== Nothing Nice New York ===
Hormeku founded his own clothing line, Nothing Nice New York. Nothing Nice New York offers all forms of menswear, from ready-to-wear suits and ties to T-shirts and bespoke.

=== Vida Chocolate ===
In 2014, Vida released a collector's pack where new cigar aficionados can purchase six hundred cigars in a vintage humidor. Along with local sales, Vida Chocolate cigars have been sold to the international market—two boutiques in Canada and one shop in France.

=== Steel Wine and Spirits ===
Hormeku founded Steel Wine and Spirits to offer his original brand of sparkling wine.
